Milena Jazmin Agudelo Medina (born 15 April 1985) is a Colombian athlete specializing in the pole vault. She is a multiple South American and CAC medalist. Her personal best jump is 4.21 metres from 2005 which is the current national record.

Competition record

References
 IAAF profile

1985 births
Living people
Colombian pole vaulters
Female pole vaulters
Colombian female athletes
Athletes (track and field) at the 2003 Pan American Games
Pan American Games competitors for Colombia
South American Games silver medalists for Colombia
South American Games medalists in athletics
Central American and Caribbean Games gold medalists for Colombia
Competitors at the 2006 South American Games
Competitors at the 2002 Central American and Caribbean Games
Competitors at the 2006 Central American and Caribbean Games
Competitors at the 2010 Central American and Caribbean Games
Central American and Caribbean Games medalists in athletics
20th-century Colombian women
21st-century Colombian women